Myrina is a purely Afrotropical genus of butterfly in the family Lycaenidae containing a total of five species.

Species
Myrina anettae De Fleury, 1924
Myrina dermaptera (Wallengren, 1857)
Myrina sharpei Bethune-Baker, 1906
Myrina silenus (Fabricius, 1775)
Myrina subornata Lathy, 1903

Etymology
Early authors often named insects for classical figures. This one is named for Myrina, queen of the Amazons.

References

External links
"Myrina Fabricius, 1807" at Markku Savela's Lepidoptera and Some Other Life Forms

Amblypodiini
Lycaenidae genera
Taxa named by Johan Christian Fabricius